Rhysopaussini is a tribe of darkling beetles in the family Tenebrionidae. There are at least four genera in Rhysopaussini.

Genera
These genera belong to the tribe Rhysopaussini:
 Mimoxenotermes Pic, 1931  (Indomalaya)
 Rhysopaussus Wasmann, 1896  (Indomalaya)
 Rhyzodina Chevrolat, 1873  (tropical Africa)
 Xenotermes Wasmann, 1896  (Indomalaya)

References

Further reading

 
 

Tenebrionoidea